The 1998 Winnipeg municipal election was held on October 28, 1998 to elect a mayor, councillors and school trustees in the city of Winnipeg.

Centre-left candidate Glen Murray defeated populist right-winger Peter Kaufmann in the mayoral contest.

Results

Mayor

Councillors

Ed Pilbeam is a welder, and was president of the Chalmers Community Club in the 1990s.  Pilbeam was 39 years old during the 1998 election, and made tax relief and crime his primary issues.

Gerald Duguay was 59 years old in 1998, and owned Duguay Pool Services.  He first sought election to Winnipeg City Council in 1980 as a candidate of the centre-right Independent Citizens' Election Committee, and finished second against Evelyne Reese in the Langevin ward.  In 1998, he argued that property taxes were the primary issue in his ward.  After losing the election, he said he felt sorry for St. Boniface residents.

School trustees

Electors could vote for three candidates.  Percentages are determined in relation to the total number of votes.

Ron Marshall was a St. James-Assiniboia School Trustee from 1992 to 2006, and chaired the board's finance committee for a time.  In 1993, he criticized as inaccurate a University of Manitoba report that suggested Winnipeg residents did not trust the city's public school system.  Two years later, he opposed his board's decision to close Jameswood School, saying that its low teacher-student ratio made it the envy of other schools in the city.  In 2001, he supported a new theatre project for Sturgeon Creek Collegiate.  He retired in 2006.  Marshall supported the "consensus approach" of the St. James-Assiniboia board, and said that trustees should avoid partisan politics.
Sandra Paterson-Greene first campaigned for a seat on the St. James-Assiniboia School Board in 1986 under the name Sandra Paterson, and was narrowly defeated for the final position.  She was elected in 1995, and re-elected in 1998, 2002 and 2006.  Paterson-Greene has served as chair of the Assiniboia-St. James board's education and divisional multipurpose committees.  In 2001-02, she spearheaded an effort to build a new theatre at Sturgeon Creek Collegiate.  The board rejected the proposal in September 2002, by a vote of 6-3.  In early 2003, she called on the federal government to toughen its laws against marijuana.

Electors could vote for three candidates.  Percentages are determined in relation to the total number of votes.

David George was first elected in 1998, and opposed the contracting out of bus services in 2000.  He did not seek re-election in 2002.

Electors could vote for three candidates.  Percentages are determined in relation to the total number of votes.

Bill Lyons is a retired city clerk in Winnipeg.  He was the city's planning committee clerk for many years, and became the chair of its board of adjustment in 1992.  By 2000, he was executive director of the Transcona Business Improvement Zone.  He was also a perennial candidate for public office, running for the Transcona ward on city council in 1989 and 1995, and for the Transcona-Springfield School Board in 1986 and 1998.  He was defeated each time.  Lyons called for a solution to Transcona's flooding problems in 1995, and supported the principle of having fewer managers and more front-line workers at city hall.

References

1998
1998 elections in Canada
1998 in Manitoba
October 1998 events in Canada